The contact process is the current method of producing sulfuric acid in the high concentrations needed for industrial processes. Platinum was originally used as the catalyst for this reaction; however, as it is susceptible to reacting with arsenic impurities in the sulfur feedstock, vanadium(V) oxide (V2O5) is now preferred.

History
This process was patented in 1831 by British vinegar merchant Peregrine Phillips. In addition to being a far more economical process for producing concentrated sulfuric acid than the previous lead chamber process, the contact process also produces sulfur trioxide and oleum.

In 1901 Eugen de Haën patented the basic process involving combining sulfur dioxide and oxygen in the presence of vanadium oxides, producing sulfur trioxide which was easily absorbed into water, producing sulfuric acid.  This process was improved remarkably by shrinking the particle size of the catalyst (e.g. :le 5000 microns), a process discovered by two chemists of BASF in 1914.

Process 

The process can be divided into four stages:

 Combining of sulfur and oxygen (O2) to form sulfur dioxide, then purify the sulfur dioxide in a purification unit
 Adding an excess of oxygen to sulfur dioxide in the presence of the catalyst vanadium pentoxide at 450 °C and 1-2 atm
 The sulfur trioxide formed is added to sulfuric acid which gives rise to oleum (disulfuric acid)
 The oleum is then added to water to form sulfuric acid which is very concentrated. Since this process is an exothermic reaction, the reaction temperature should be as low as possible.

Purification of the air and sulfur dioxide (SO2) is necessary to avoid catalyst poisoning (i.e. removing catalytic activities). The gas is then washed with water and dried with sulfuric acid.

To conserve energy, the mixture is heated by exhaust gases from the catalytic converter by heat exchangers.

Sulfur dioxide and dioxygen then react as follows:

2 SO2(g) + O2(g) ⇌ 2 SO3(g) : ΔH = -197 kJ·mol−1

According to the Le Chatelier's principle, a lower temperature should be used to shift the chemical equilibrium towards the right, hence increasing the percentage yield. However too low of a temperature will lower the formation rate to an uneconomical level. Hence to increase the reaction rate, high temperatures (450 °C), medium pressures (1-2 atm), and vanadium(V) oxide (V2O5) are used to ensure an adequate (>95%) conversion. The catalyst only serves to increase the rate of reaction as it does not change the position of the thermodynamic equilibrium. The mechanism for the action of the catalyst comprises two steps:

 Oxidation of SO2 into SO3 by V5+:
 2SO2 + 4V5+ + 2O2− → 2SO3 + 4V4+
 Oxidation of V4+ back into V5+ by dioxygen (catalyst regeneration):
 4V4+ + O2 → 4V5+ + 2O2−

Hot sulfur trioxide passes through the heat exchanger and is dissolved in concentrated H2SO4 in the absorption tower to form oleum

 H2SO4  + SO3  → H2S2O7 

Note that directly dissolving SO3 in water is impractical due to the highly exothermic nature of the reaction. Acidic vapor or mists are formed instead of a liquid.

Oleum is reacted with water to form concentrated H2SO4.

H2S2O7  + H2O  → 2 H2SO4

Purification unit 
This includes the dusting tower, cooling pipes, scrubbers, drying tower, arsenic purifier and testing box. Sulfur dioxide has many impurities such as vapours, dust particles and arsenous oxide. Therefore, it must be purified to avoid catalyst poisoning (i.e.: destroying catalytic activity and loss of efficiency). In this process, the gas is washed with water, and dried by sulfuric acid. In the dusting tower, the sulfur dioxide is exposed to a steam which removes the dust particles. After the gas is cooled, the sulfur dioxide enters the washing tower where it is sprayed by water to remove any soluble impurities. In the drying tower, sulfuric acid is sprayed on the gas to remove the moisture from it. Finally, the arsenic oxide is removed when the gas is exposed to ferric hydroxide.

Double contact double absorption 

The next step to the contact process is double contact double absorption (DCDA). In this process the product gases (SO2) and (SO3) are passed through absorption towers twice to achieve further absorption and conversion of SO2 to SO3 and production of higher grade sulfuric acid.

SO2-rich gases enter the catalytic converter, usually a tower with multiple catalyst beds, and are converted to SO3, achieving the first stage of conversion. The exit gases from this stage contain both SO2 and SO3 which are passed through intermediate absorption towers where sulfuric acid is trickled down packed columns and SO3 reacts with water increasing the sulfuric acid concentration. Though SO2 too passes through the tower it is unreactive and comes out of the absorption tower.

This stream of gas containing SO2, after necessary cooling is passed through the catalytic converter bed column again achieving up to 99.8% conversion of SO2 to SO3 and the gases are again passed through the final absorption column thus  achieving not only high conversion efficiency for SO2, but also enabling production of a higher concentration of sulfuric acid.

The industrial production of sulfuric acid involves proper control of temperatures and flow rates of the gases as both the conversion efficiency and absorption are dependent on these.

See also 
 Lead chamber process

Notes

References 

 The Repertory of Patent Inventions, no. 72 (April 1831), page 248.
 (Anon.) (1832) "English patents:  Specification of the patent granted to Peregrine Phillips, Jr. of Bristol, in the county of Somersetshire, Vinegar Maker, for an improvement in manufacturing Sulphuric Acid.  Dated March 21, 1831." Journal of the Franklin Institute, new series, vol. 9, pages 180-182.
 Ernest Cook (March 20, 1926) "Peregrine Phillips, the inventor of the contact process for sulphuric acid," Nature, 117 (2942) : 419–421.
 Lunge, Theoretical and Practical Treatise on the Manufacture of Sulphuric Acid and Alkali, with the Collateral Branches, 3rd ed., vol. 1, part 2 (London, England:  Gurney and Jackson, 1903),  page 975

External links 

 
 
 

Chemical processes
Vanadium
Sulfur
Catalysis